Grassdale is an Italianate-style villa in Louisa County, Virginia, notable for its size and style in a stable, rural region.  The house was built in 1861 by James Maury Morris, Jr., a member of the prominent Morris family of Louisa County. The tract had originally been assembled by James Morris' grandfather, Colonel Richard Morris, who had established the neighboring Green Springs plantation.  The property is part of the Green Springs National Historic Landmark District, established to preserve the notable houses of the area and their surrounding landscapes.

Description
Grassdale is a two-story brick house in a T-shaped plan. A broad veranda surrounds the house on the front (east) side and part of the south side. The exterior features extensive bracketing in scales varied to suit the main house and the porch. The ell takes the form of a projecting pavilion, with its own projecting porch. The interior is laid out around a central hall with a room on either side, a cross hall with a stairway, and a dining room to the rear. The front hall is set apart from the cross hall with pilasters and an entablature. The main rooms have access to the porch through full-length windows that raise into a pocket in the wall above. Outbuildings include a smokehouse and a two-story kitchen.

History
James Maury Morris Jr. inherited the property from his father, Dr. James Maury Morris Sr., in 1844. There had been structures at the site prior to the construction of the 1861 house.  James Jr. died in 1872, leaving Grassdale to his widow.  Their daughter, Imogene, inherited the house. Her husband was Rear Admiral David Watson Taylor, whose Watson and Taylor family connections were notable apart from his own notability in naval affairs and ship design. Imogene sold the house to the Walton Lumber Company in 1943.

Grassdale was listed on the National Register of Historic Places on July 2, 1973. It is included in the Green Springs National Historic Landmark District, which encompasses much of the surrounding countryside.

References

Houses on the National Register of Historic Places in Virginia
Houses completed in 1861
Houses in Louisa County, Virginia
Italianate architecture in Virginia
National Register of Historic Places in Louisa County, Virginia
1861 establishments in Virginia
U.S. Route 15